Matt Garside is an English rugby league footballer who plays as a  forward and  for Dewsbury Rams in the Betfred Championship.

He previously played for the Gateshead Thunder in Championship 1, and the York City Knights, Sheffield Eagles and the London Broncos in the Championship. Garside also played for the Bradford Bulls in League 1.

Playing career

Gateshead Thunder
In 2010, Garside played for Gateshead Thunder making 12 appearances and scoring four tries.

York City Knights
During 2011 and 2012, Matt Garside played for York City making 46 appearances and scoring 16 tries.

Sheffield Eagles
on 6 September 2012, Sheffield announced the signing of Garside from the 2013 Championship season onwards. Garside played a large part of Sheffield's Grand Final winning season scoring 9 tries in 27 games with impressive performances.

London Broncos
On 2 September 2014 relegated Super League side, London Broncos, announced the signing of Garside on a two-year full-time contract. This is his first full-time contract. Commenting on it (extract from reference), "I'm really excited to be joining the club and starting the hard work to take us into a strong Championship season. It's a massive move for me and I am really happy that I have been given the opportunity to move down to London and become a full-time athlete."

Bradford Bulls
In September 2017 his contract ran out at London so he signed for Bradford on a two-year deal.

Halifax
In 2020, Garside signed a contract to join Halifax.

References

External links
Bradford Bulls profile
London Broncos profile

1990 births
Living people
Dewsbury Rams players
English rugby league players
Halifax R.L.F.C. players
London Broncos players
Newcastle Thunder players
Rugby league centres
Rugby league locks
Rugby league second-rows
Sheffield Eagles players
York City Knights players